Brew Detroit is a contract brewery operating in Detroit, Michigan. The company also produces small-batch craft beers.

History 
A small group of Michigan investors formed Brew Detroit in September 2012. Their goal was to create a contract brewing company that provides larger capacity production services to a multitude of emerging Michigan beer brands. The venture started with $8 million of private capital, which allowed the company to build a facility in Detroit's historic Corktown district.

As part of its commitment to investing in Detroit, the venture donated 2% of its equity ownership to the New Common School Foundation which raises scholarship funds for the city's Cornerstone Schools.

Brew Detroit launched brewing and packaging operations at its Corktown facility in early 2014. It later opened a tasting room and retail shop in November 2015. Its initial brewing customers included four Michigan brands: Atwater Brewery, BADASS American Lager, Motor City Brewing Works, and Big Red Beverages.

Stroh's was added to its brewing clientele in 2016 when it obtained approval to brew a Bohemian-style pilsner based upon Stroh's original formula.

Sourcing Process:

Brew Detroit sources from local farms and purveyors to provide its food and beverages. The meat they use is locally sourced through Black Angus cattle farms. It is then transported through Grand River Butchery in the Manchester market in Manchester, Michigan. At the Grand River Bakery, the desserts and baked goods are freshly made from scratch on a daily basis.

Current Brands Brewed
Old Nation Brewing Company

References

External links
https://www.brewdetroit.com/

Beer brewing companies based in Michigan
Companies based in Detroit
Manufacturing companies based in Detroit
American companies established in 2012